World Tales, subtitled "The Extraordinary Coincidence of Stories Told in All Times, in All Places" is a book of 65 folk tales collected by Idries Shah from around the world, mostly from literary sources. Some of the tales are very current, others are less well known.

Content
Each story is preceded by a short introduction by the author, giving a brief history of the tale's literary mutations, or remarking on the strange similarities that versions exhibit across great geographical or historical distances. The collection has had a broad appeal. For instance Canadian poet P. K. Page cited it as the book she would give to a child, and author and storyteller Norah Dooley: "This is the book that turned my interest as an adult to folklore and inspired me to take up storytelling." and has become a widely used sourcebook of tales.

Whilst Shah mentions many of the ancient and modern interpretations that have been placed on the tales, along with some of the theories of cross-cultural transmission, he himself interprets them little, writing in the introduction: 
 
The value that Shah put on folklore of this kind is clear, not only from the many volumes of tales that he published but also from books published by his children. The title alone of one of his daughter Saira Shah's books, The Storyteller's Daughter, gives some indication, while his son Tahir Shah's book In Arabian Nights, itself an exploration of the power of the folktale, recalls:

Original illustrated edition

The book was first published in large format by Harcourt Brace Jovanovich with each tale illustrated. Originally Shah asked Ivan Tyrrell to find illustrations for the tales by the likes of Arthur Rackham, Kay Nielsen and Edmund Dulac. Tyrrell instead suggested commissioning new work, Shah agreed to this and the idea was put to, and approved by, the publisher, William Jovanovich. Thirty seven artists contributed. This edition is no longer in print; the Octagon Press edition is text only.

Agnes Perkins, writing in the Children's Literature Association Quarterly cited this "lavish" edition of World Tales as an example of books that bridge the gap between illustrated books of folktales published for the juvenile market which pay little attention to sources or to authenticity of tone and language and which supply none of the working tools developed for folklore scholarship which might lead readers to further study of tales from the oral tradition, and collections by folklorists concerned primarily with local variants and the unusual persistence of motifs which ignore questions of the value of the stories from a literary standpoint.

Examples of stories

List of stories

Tales of a Parrot
Dick Whittington
Don't Count Your chickens
The Hawk and the Nightingale
Cenino the Tiny
Her Lover's Heart
The New Hand
The Mastermaid
The Hermit
The Maiden Wiser than the Tsar
The Travelling Companion
The Riddles
The Grateful Animals and the Ungrateful Man
The Value of a Treasure Hoard
Patient Griselda
How Evil Produces Evil
The Ghoul and the Youth of Ispahan
The Pilgrim from Paradise
The Blind Ones & the Matter of the Elephant
Anpu and Bata
God Is Stronger
The Happiest Man in the World
The Gorgon's Head
The Brahmin's Wife and the Mongoose
The Magic Bag
Catherine's Fate
The Desolate Island
Gazelle Horn
Tom Tit Tot
The Silent Couple
Childe Rowland
The Tale of Mushkil Gusha
The Food of Paradise
The Lamb with the Golden Fleece
The Man with the Wen
The Skilful Brothers
The Algonquin Cinderella
The Kindly Ghost
The Ass in Panther Skin
The Water of Life
The Serpent
The Wonderful Lamp
Who Was the Most Generous?
Cupid and Psyche
The Royal Detectives
Conflict of the Magicians
False Witnesses
The Cobbler who Became an Astrologer
The Two Travellers
The Fisherman and His Wife
Impossible Judgement
Hudden and Dudden and Donald O'Neary
Riquet with the Tuft
The Lost Camel
The Beggar and the Gazelle
The Apple on the Boy's Head
The Boots of Hunain
The Three Caskets
The Land Where Time Stood Still
The Man Turned into a Mule
The Fox and the Hedgehog
The Bird Maiden
The Slowest May Win the Race
The Three Imposters
Occasion

Reviews

See also
The Idries Shah Foundation

References

External links
 The Idries Shah Foundation web page on World Tales

Collections of fairy tales
Storytelling
Books by Idries Shah
Folklore
1979 books
Lists of stories